Route 27, also known as Main Street and Dog River Road, is a , two-lane, uncontrolled-access, secondary highway in central Prince Edward Island. Route 27 was created upon the opening of a new alignment of Route 1 bypassing the town of Cornwall on October 21, 2019. The route is entirely in Queens County.

Route description
The route constitutes the former alignment of Route 1 through the town of Cornwall. The route diverges from Route 1 at an interchange east of the community of New Haven and proceeds eastward through the Clyde River valley into Cornwall, constituting the town's main street. The road curves northward at an intersection with Route 19 and continues through the town and farmland to the northeast. The route ends at a roundabout intersection with routes 1 and 248 in the community of North River.

Major intersections

References

027
027
Prince Edward Island Route 27